Izamal is a small city in the Mexican state of Yucatán,  east of state capital Mérida, in southern Mexico.

Izamal was continuously occupied throughout most of Mesoamerican chronology; in 2000, the city's estimated population was 15,000 people.  Izamal is known in Yucatán as the Yellow City (most of its buildings are painted yellow) and the City of Hills (that actually are the remains of ancient temple pyramids).

Pre-Columbian Izamal 

Izamal is an important archaeological site of the Pre-Columbian Maya civilization. Izamal developed a particular constructive technique involving use of megalithic carved blocks, with defined architectonical characteristics like rounded corners, projected mouldings and thatched roofs at superstructures, which also appeared in other important urban centers within its hitherland, such as Ake, Uci and Dzilam.

The city was founded during the Late Formative Period (750–200 BC) and was continuously occupied until the Spanish Conquest. The most important constructive activity stage spans between Protoclassic (200 BC – 200 AD) and Late Classic (600–800 AD). It was partially abandoned with the rise of Chichen Itza in the Terminal Classic (800–1000 A.D.) until the end of the Precolumbian era, when Izamal was considered a site of pilgrimages in the region, rivaled only by Chichen Itza. Its principal temples were sacred to the creator deity Itzamna and to the Sun god Kinich Ahau.

Five huge Pre-Columbian structures are still easily visible at Izamal (and two from some distance away in all directions). The first is a great pyramid to the Maya Sun god, Kinich Kak Moo (macaw of the solar fire face) with a base covering over 2 acres (8,000 m2) of ground and a volume of some 700,000 cubic meters.  Atop this grand base is a pyramid of ten levels.  To the south-east lies another great temple, called Itzamatul, and placed at the south of what was a main plaza, another huge building, called Ppap Hol Chak, was partially destroyed with the construction of a Franciscan temple during the 16th century.  The south-west side of the plaza is partially limited by another pyramid, the Hun Pik Tok, and in the west lie the remains of the temple known as Kabul, where a great stucco mask still existed on one side as recently as the 1840s, as seen in a colored lithograph after a drawing by Frederick Catherwood. All these large man-made mounds probably were built up over several centuries and originally supported city palaces and temples. Other important residential buildings which have been restored and can be visited are Xtul (The Rabbit), Habuc and Chaltun Ha.

After more than a decade of archaeological work done by Mexican archaeologists at Izamal, over 163 archaeologically important structures have been found there, and thousands of residential structures at surrounding communities have been located.

Spanish Colonial era
After the Spanish conquest of Yucatán in the 16th century a Spanish colonial city was founded atop the existing Maya one; however it was decided that it would take a prohibitively large amount of work to level these two huge structures and so the Spanish contented themselves with placing a small Christian temple atop the great pyramid and building a large Franciscan Monastery atop the acropolis.  It was named after San Antonio de Padua. Completed in 1561, the open atrium of the Monastery is still today second in size only to that at the Vatican. Most of the cut stone from the Pre-Columbian city was reused to build the Spanish churches, monastery, and surrounding buildings.

Izamal was the first chair of the Bishops of Yucatán before they were moved to Mérida.  The fourth Bishop of Yucatán, Diego de Landa lived here.

Modern history
The town of Izamal was first granted the status of city by the government of Yucatán on 4 December 1841. On 13 August 1923 it was demoted to town status. It was again officially ranked as a city on 1 December 1981.

In 1975 the official in charge of land redistribution was repeatedly accused of political corruption; letters of complaint were sent from citizens of Izamal to Mérida and Mexico City with no response. The official was found stoned to death under a large pile of rocks in the town's main square. A Mexican Army unit occupied the town for some days after the incident, but investigators failed to find anyone in town who knew anything about what happened. 

Pope John Paul II visited Izamal in August 1993, where he performed a mass and presented the statue of the Virgin with a silver crown.

Present day
Izamal remains a place of pilgrimage within the Yucatán state, now for the veneration of Roman Catholic saints.  Several saints statues at Izamal are said to perform miracles. An early colonial era statue of the Virgin of the Immaculate Conception ("Our Lady of Izamal") is particularly venerated, and is the Yucatán state's patron saint.

The Yucatec Maya language is still heard at least as much as Spanish in Izamal. It is the first language in the homes of the majority of the people. Most signs are in both languages.

Major Fiestas are held in Izamal on April 3, May 3, August 15, and December 8.

Izamal is the home of a distillery which produces an eponymous mezcal from the hearts of the locally grown agave plants.

Izamal was named a "Pueblo Mágico" in 2002.

Climate

Gallery

References

External links

 
 Izamal's monastery on colonial-mexico.com with photos and a map of the center of town
 Izamal by Yucatan Today
 Izamal Photo Essay

Maya sites in Yucatán
Populated places in Yucatán
Pueblos Mágicos
National Monuments of Mexico
Populated places established in the 1st millennium BC
Former populated places in Mexico
World Heritage Tentative List for Mexico